Djamila Marek (born 5 May 1980) is an Algerian former footballer who played as a forward for the Algeria women's national team.

Club career
Marek has played for JS Kabylie and ASE Alger Centre in Algeria.

International career
Marek capped for Algeria at senior level during two Africa Women Cup of Nations editions (2006 and 2018).

References

External links

1980 births
Living people
Footballers from Tizi Ouzou
Algerian women's footballers
Algeria women's international footballers
Women's association football forwards
Algerian emigrants to the United Arab Emirates
Naturalized citizens of the United Arab Emirates
Emirati women's footballers
United Arab Emirates women's international footballers
Dual internationalists (women's football)
Emirati people of Algerian descent